Kings Norton Mint was a 19th-century metalworking and minting company founded in Birmingham, England. As a private company it worked to develop and manufacture various metal products including wire, nails, ammunitions and later coins on behalf of the Royal Mint. Notably it is credited with inventing solid-drawn ammunition cartridges for small firearms.

History 
The Kings Norton Mint was founded in 1889 as The King's Norton Metal Company by engineers Thomas Richard Bayliss and George Hagger. Initially the company specialised in the manufacture of coinage strip and coin blanks however also produces products for the construction industry. Prior to the mint's creation the nearby Birmingham Mint under the ownership of Ralph Heaton III had dominated the industry little competition in competing for minting contract. By 1912 the company acquired a contract from the Royal Mint to supply bronze Planchet for its London based facility and later started to supply coinage for the British Empire. Working in conjunction with the Royal Mint and the Birmingham Mint the Kings Norton Mint eventually struck its own coin series marked with a K N mint mark.

With the outbreak of World War I priorities shifted towards the war effort and instead focused on ammunitions and weaponry.

In 1926 the Mint was amalgamated into Imperial Chemical Industries.

References 

Mints of the United Kingdom
British companies established in 1889